Ashes to Dust is the second studio album by American musician/songwriter William Elliott Whitmore. It was released in 2005 on the Southern Records label.

Track listing
All tracks by William Elliott Whitmore

 "Midnight" – 3:34
 "The Day the End Finally Came" – 4:18
 "When Push Comes to Love" – 3:50
 "Diggin' My Grave" – 4:06
 "The Buzzards Won't Cry" – 2:22
 "Sorest of Eyes" – 3:30
 "Lift My Jug (Song for Hub Cale)" – 3:36
 "Gravel Road" – 3:52
 "Porchlight" – 5:47

Personnel
 William Elliott Whitmore – vocals, guitar, banjo
 Zach Action – bass 
Jay Thomas Dandurand – drums

See also
 2005 in music

References

External links
 Official Site

William Elliott Whitmore albums
2005 albums
Southern Records albums